Shafiqul Islam (born 24 May 1960) is a Bangladeshi American researcher, academic and author. He is Professor of Civil and Environmental Engineering and Professor of Water Diplomacy at Tufts University. He serves as the Director of Water Diplomacy. He is also the Founding Editor of the Water Diplomacy Series.

Islam's work has been focused on availability, access and allocation of water within the context of climate challenges, health, and diplomacy. His work has been significant in the creation of the area of Water diplomacy. He has written over 100 scientific articles and four books.

In 2016, Islam received the Prince Sultan bin Abdulaziz International Prize for Water. He was elected fellow of the American Geophysical Union in 2020.

Early life and education 
Islam was born in Bangladesh on 24 May 1960. He received his Bachelor of Engineering in Civil Engineering from Bangladesh University of Engineering and Technology (BUET) with Honors. He taught in BUET for a year before moving to the United States. In the United States, he received his Master of Science in Environmental Engineering from the University of Maine.

Islam received his Doctor of Science from the Massachusetts Institute of Technology in 1991. He worked with Rafael L. Bras and Ignacio Rodriguez-Iturbe from hydrology and Edward Lorenz and Kerry Emanuel from meteorology to examine predictability of precipitation for his doctoral dissertation.

Career 
Islam joined University of Cincinnati as an Assistant Professor in 1991, becoming Associate Professor in 1997 and Full Professor in 2001. He served as the Founding Director of Cincinnati Earth Systems Sciences Program from 1995 to 2004 and as the Director Graduate Studies, Department of Civil and Environmental Engineering from 2000 to 2004.

In 2004, Islam left University of Cincinnati and joined Tufts University. There he served as the Associate Dean of Engineering for Research from 2006 to 2009. In 2010, he was appointed the Director of Water Diplomacy Program. In 2012, Islam became the Founding Editor of Water Diplomacy Series.

Islam's research has been covered in several media outlets including BBC World Service, New York Times, Boston Globe, World Bank, Vox, The Hague Department of Justice, The Daily Star, and Yale Environment 360.

In 2020, Islam founded D3M@Tufts (Data Driven Decision Making @ Tufts) Program, which synthesizes numbers and narratives to help STEM and non-STEM students to make data driven decision making under uncertainty. This program is funded by the US National Science Foundation. In 2021, Islam was appointed as the Editor of Water Resources Research, a journal of the American Geophysical Union.

Research and work

Water diplomacy 
In his early career, Islam took two complementary areas of geoscience research: scale issues and remote sensing within the context of climate challenges and water borne diseases to solve scientific problems. Between 1990 and 2000, he focused on a research strategy that integrated issues of scales with another area: growing availability of multi-sensor data from remote sensing. Later, Islam started focusing on water science and engineering for actionable societal impact.

Islam addressed the problem of water science for societal impact in his first book Water diplomacy: A Negotiated Approach to Managing Complex Water Networks where he suggested that "the solution space for these complex problems - involving interdependent variables, processes, actors, and institutions - can't be pre-stated. Consequently, one can't know what will or can happen with any reasonable certainty. To address these persistent water problems, one needs to start by acknowledging the limits of our knowing to act and the contingent nature of our action. When neither the certainty of scientific solutions nor the consensus of what solutions to implement exists, what we need is Water Diplomacy." In an NSF funded project, Islam initiated the Water Diplomacy Program. In another NSF funded project, Islam helped to create a Water Diplomacy Research Coordination Network with over 400 water scholars and professionals from 70 countries. A Negotiated Approach to Managing Complex Water Networks was translated in Chinese by the China Ministry of Water Resources and Chinese Research Academy of Environmental  Sciences and published by the Science Press of China. 

To put the theory of Water Diplomacy Framework into practice, Islam initiated Water Diplomacy Workshop in Boston. His second book Water Diplomacy in Action: Contingent Approaches to Managing Complex Water Problems came out in 2017, followed by Complexity of Transboundary Water Conflicts: Enabling Conditions for Negotiating Contingent Resolutions in 2018. In 2019, he wrote Interdisciplinary Collaboration for Water Diplomacy: A Principled and Pragmatic Approach.

Climate and health
Islam's research group has also looked at the apparently disconnected water problems of cholera and water conflict to provide synthesis of theory and practice of science for measurable societal outcomes. Islam in collaboration Rita Colwell provided an approach to develop a satellite-based cholera prediction model. Islam-Colwell team was awarded the 2016 Prince Sultan bin Abdul Aziz International Water Prize in Creativity at the UN Headquarter in New York by the UN Secretary General.

Awards and honors 
2001 - Senior Fulbright Scholar
2004 - Distinguished Senior Faculty Research Award, Engineering, University of Cincinnati
2004 - Bernard M. Gordon Senior Faculty Fellow in Engineering, Tufts University
2016 - Prince Sultan Bin Abdulaziz International Water Prize in Creativity
2016 – Remarkable Feats: National Recognition Award, The Daily Star, Bangladesh
2020 - Fellow, American Geophysical Union.

References 

Living people
Bangladeshi American
Tufts University faculty
Bangladesh University of Engineering and Technology alumni
University of Maine alumni
Massachusetts Institute of Technology alumni
1960 births